Stephen Watt is an English male curler.

At the national level, he is a six-time English men's champion curler (1990, 1991, 1992, 1993, 1994, 1995).

Teams

References

External links

Living people
English male curlers
English curling champions
Year of birth missing (living people)
Place of birth missing (living people)